Manggūltai (1587 – 11 January 1633)  was a Manchu noble and an important military and political leader in the early years of the Qing dynasty. He helped Hong Taiji consolidate his power by handing over his Plain Blue Banner to Taiji's. He died when he was 45 to 46 years old in 1633.

Family background
Manggūltai was born in the Manchu Aisin Gioro clan as the fifth son of Nurhaci, the founder of the Qing dynasty. His mother was one of Nurhaci's primary consorts, who was from the Fuca clan. He was an older half-brother of Nurhaci's successor, Hong Taiji.

Career

Nurhaci's reign
When Nurhaci assumed the title of Khan in 1616, Manggūltai was named one of the Four Senior Beile, to assist Nurhaci's administration. The other three beiles were Daišan, Amin, and Hong Taiji. Starting in 1621, Manggūltai and the other three senior beiles served as assistants to Nurhaci on a monthly rotational basis in directing state affairs of the Later Jin dynasty.

Hong Taiji's reign
After Nurhaci's death, Daišan used his influence to make the princes and generals to agree on Hong Taiji's accession as Khan. Although Hong Taiji had become Khan, Manggūltai, along with Daišan and Amin continued to take turns as assistant administrators until 1629, when Hong Taiji had begun to consolidate power.

Manggūltai handed over the Plain Blue Banner to Hong Taiji, which was the third strongest banner. In this way, Hong Taiji slowly eliminated his competitor's powers.

Family 
Primary Consort

 First wife, of the Nara clan (嫡福晉 那拉氏)
 Second wife, of the Hada Nara clan (繼妻 哈達那拉氏)
 Maidali (邁達禮; 15 June 1603 – January/February 1634), first son
 Guanggu (廣顧; 22 August 1604 – 1606), second son
 Sahaliang (薩哈良; 21 March 1606 – 1642), third son
 Ebilun (額弼綸; b. 4 February 1609), fifth son
 Feiyanggutai (費揚古泰; b. 11 April 1610), sixth son
 Aketama (阿克塔瑪; 1620–1622), eighth son

 Third wife, of an unknown clan (三娶妻)
 Shusong (舒鬆; 3 January 1624 – 1652), ninth son

Concubine

 Concubine, of an unknown clan (妾)
 Sadong'e (薩棟額; b. 1608), fourth son
 Sahana (薩哈納; b. 11 April 1614), seventh son

Ancestry

References

1587 births
1633 deaths
Nurhaci's sons
Deliberative Princes and Ministers
Manchu Plain Blue Bannermen